The Sixth & I Historic Synagogue is a non-denominational, non-membership, non-traditional Jewish synagogue located at the corner of Sixth Street and I Street, NW in the Chinatown neighborhood of Washington, D.C. It is one of the oldest synagogues in the city. In addition to hosting religious services for different Jewish denominations, the synagogue hosts many lectures, concerts, and art exhibitions for the general public.

History
The building was constructed by the Adas Israel Congregation and dedicated on January 8, 1908, near what was then the main commercial district in town and the center of the Jewish community in Washington. In 1951 the congregation moved to a new building on Connecticut Avenue and sold its building on the corner of 6th and I Streets, NW to the Turner Memorial A.M.E. Church. The church in turn moved to Hyattsville, Maryland, fifty years later.

Three local Jewish developers saved the historic building from being turned into a nightclub and restored it to its original roots as a synagogue. The main impetus for the restoration came from real estate developer Shelton Zuckerman, who contacted then Washington Wizards owner Abe Pollin, who in turn contacted Douglas Jemal. Working from wedding photos from 1949, the building was returned to its original design and decor. It was rededicated and opened to the public on April 22, 2004.

Cultural events and live entertainment 
Sixth & I’s arts and culture programming includes talks, concerts, and comedy shows. Speakers and authors have included Supreme Court Justices Ruth Bader Ginsburg, Stephen Breyer, John Paul Stevens, Elena Kagan, and Sandra Day O’Connor; Secretaries of State John Kerry, Colin Powell, Madeleine Albright, and Condoleezza Rice; Nobel Laureates Toni Morrison, V. S. Naipaul, Orhan Pamuk, Kazuo Ishiguro, Elie Wiesel, Al Gore, Sir Paul Nurse, Kofi Annan, Paul Krugman, and Daniel Kahneman; President George W. Bush, Ta-Nehisi Coates, Salman Rushdie, Judy Blume, Sheryl Sandberg, Mindy Kaling, Joan Rivers, Chimamanda Adichie, Atul Gawande, Nancy Pelosi, Annie Leibovitz, Lewis Black, Temple Grandin, Van Jones, Tina Fey, Jenna Bush Hager and Barbara Pierce Bush, Cecile Richards, Ina Garten, and Emily Ratajkowski.

Bands and singers have included Adele, Idina Menzel, Valerie June, Brooklyn Rider, Andra Day, Kris Kristofferson, Bryan Adams, Thirty Seconds to Mars, Art Garfunkel, LeAnn Rimes, Grizzly Bear, Idan Raichel Project, Yael Naim, Ani DiFranco, Joanna Newsom, Antony and the Johnsons, M. Ward, Devendra Banhart, Fiona Apple, Laura Marling, Marc Broussard, Kishi Bashi, Gavin DeGraw, Trey Anastasio, Rodriguez, Mick Jenkins, Esperanza Spalding, and Matisyahu.

Comedians have included Hasan Minaj, Amy Schumer, Marc Maron, W. Kamau Bell, Michael Ian Black, Michael Showalter, Whitney Cummings, Rachel Bloom, Todd Barry, Nick Kroll, Joe Mande, Russell Howard, Norm Macdonald, Gilmore Guys, and the Upright Citizens Brigade Touring Company.

Jewish life
Sixth & I’s Jewish programming includes education, Shabbat services, holiday celebrations, and social justice work. During the High Holidays, Sixth & I rents space from nearby churches to accommodate over 3,000 people.

Partnerships
Sixth & I partners with a wide variety of local and national organizations, including Politics & Prose Bookstore, Live Nation, The New York Times, Washington Performing Arts, The Atlantic, Story District, The MacArthur Foundation, the 92nd Street Y, National Geographic, Slate, HIAS, the Jewish Emergent Network, OneTable, and many others.

See also
 Lillian & Albert Small Jewish Museum

References

External links

Sixth & I Historic Synagogue
President Bush's Visit to the Sixth & I Historic Synagogue
Synagogue Director Plays By Her Own Rules

Moorish Revival architecture in Washington, D.C.
Moorish Revival synagogues
Byzantine Revival architecture in Washington, D.C.
Byzantine Revival synagogues
Synagogues completed in 1908
Synagogue buildings with domes
Romanesque Revival architecture in Washington, D.C.
Romanesque Revival synagogues
Synagogues in Washington, D.C.
Unaffiliated synagogues in the United States
1908 establishments in Washington, D.C.